Phrurotimpus is a genus of araneomorph spiders first described by R. V. Chamberlin and Wilton Ivie in 1935. The name is a compound adjective meaning "guarding the stone". Originally added to the Liocranidae, it was moved to the Corinnidae in 2002, then to the Phrurolithidae in 2014. They have red egg sacs that look like flattened discs, often found on the underside of stones.

Species
 it contains twenty-six species in North America and China:
Phrurotimpus abditus Gertsch, 1941 – USA
Phrurotimpus alarius (Hentz, 1847) (type) – USA, Canada
Phrurotimpus a. tejanus (Chamberlin & Gertsch, 1930) – USA, Canada
Phrurotimpus annulatus Chamberlin & Ivie, 1944 – USA
Phrurotimpus baoshanensis Mu, Lin & Zhang, 2022 – China
Phrurotimpus bernikerae Platnick, 2019 – USA
Phrurotimpus borealis (Emerton, 1911) – North America
Phrurotimpus certus Gertsch, 1941 – USA, Canada
Phrurotimpus chamberlini Schenkel, 1950 – USA
Phrurotimpus daliensis Mu, Lin & Zhang, 2022 – China
Phrurotimpus dulcineus Gertsch, 1941 – USA, Canada
Phrurotimpus illudens Gertsch, 1941 – USA
Phrurotimpus lasiolepis (Fu, Chen & Zhang, 2016) – China
Phrurotimpus mateonus (Chamberlin & Gertsch, 1930) – USA
Phrurotimpus minutus (Banks, 1892) – USA
Phrurotimpus mormon (Chamberlin & Gertsch, 1930) – USA
Phrurotimpus m. xanthus Chamberlin & Ivie, 1935 – USA
Phrurotimpus palustris (Banks, 1892) – Canada, USA
Phrurotimpus parallelus (Chamberlin, 1921) – USA
Phrurotimpus sorkini Platnick, 2019 – USA
Phrurotimpus subtropicus Ivie & Barrows, 1935 – USA
Phrurotimpus truncatus Chamberlin & Ivie, 1935 – USA
Phrurotimpus umbratilis (Bishop & Crosby, 1926) – USA
Phrurotimpus wallacei (Gertsch, 1935) – USA
Phrurotimpus woodburyi (Chamberlin & Gertsch, 1929) – USA, Mexico
Phrurotimpus w. utanus Chamberlin & Ivie, 1935 – USA

References

External links
 

Araneomorphae genera
Phrurolithidae
Articles created by Qbugbot